Pavlos Prosalentis (GreeK: Παύλος Προσαλέντης; 1857, Corfu - 1894, Alexandria) was a Greek painter. He is generally referred to as "The Younger" to distinguish him from his grandfather, also named Pavlos Prosalentis, who was a sculptor.

Biography 
He was born to a prominent Corfu family. His father, Spyridon Prosalentis, was a well-known portrait painter. He studied in Corfu, Venice and Paris, where the influence on his style was srongest. Some sources add Athens and Naples to his travels. His teachers included his father and Nikiforos Lytras,  He returned to Greece in 1870.

After only a short time at home, he moved to Egypt; settling in Alexandria. It was there that most of his works were created. He was heavily influenced by the art of the late Renaissance, which was most apparent in his portraits. His subjects included notable members of the Greek communities in Egypt, as well as Prime Ministers Charilaos Trikoupis and Kyriakoulis Mavromichalis He also produced numerous paintings on a wide variety of Egyptian and Orientalist themes, and a large number of maritime scenes, as did his brother Aimilios.

One of his most familiar portraits was actually done from a photograph; that of the businessman and philanthropist, Georgios Averof. For many years, it hung in the Greek high school, in Alexandria. Since that school's closure, it has been at the Averof Gallery in Metsovo.

He died in Alexandria in 1894, of unknown causes, aged only thirty-seven.

Some of his portraits are at the Hellenic Parliament. Many are in private collections.

References

External links

 More works by Prosalentis @ ArtNet

1857 births
1894 deaths
Greek painters
Greek portrait painters
Orientalist painters
Greek emigrants to Egypt
Artists from Corfu